MOLLE (pronounced  ,, homophonic with the name Molly) is an acronym for Modular Lightweight Load-carrying Equipment. It is used to define the current generation of load-bearing equipment and backpacks used by a number of NATO armed forces, especially the British Army and the United States Army.

The system's modularity is derived from the use of Pouch Attachment Ladder System (PALS) webbing equipment as rows of heavy-duty nylon stitched onto the vest to allow for the attachment of various compatible pouches and accessories. This method of attachment has become a de facto standard for modular tactical gear, replacing the All-purpose Lightweight Individual Carrying Equipment (ALICE) system used in the earliest modular vest systems (which is still in use with many police forces).

Components

Tactical assault panel
The Tactical Assault Panel (TAP) replaces the fighting load carrier (FLC). It is a bib-like chest rig that can be used alone or mounted on the Improved Outer Tactical Vest or Soldier Plate Carrier System. The TAP is covered with PALS webbing and storage for up to eight rifle magazines (six 5.56 magazines + two 7.62 NATO magazines or eight 5.56 magazines).

Assault pack
The Assault Pack is a backpack with 2000 cubic inches (32L) of storage space.

Medium rucksack
The Medium Rucksack is an external frame rucksack with 3000 cubic inches (50L) of storage space. It is designed to be worn over body armor and supports loads up to 60 lbs. It features a large main compartment with internal dividers for items like the hydration system, 60mm mortar rounds, along with a harness for ASIP radios. Two smaller compartments are located outside the main compartment. The pack is adorned in PALS webbing.

Large rucksack

The Large Rucksack is an external frame rucksack with 4000 cubic inches (65L) of storage space. It features a large main compartment with an internal divider between the upper and lower half for organizing loads. It is covered with PALS webbing, and ALICE webbing on the side to support legacy items such as the 2 quart canteen pouch. It is highly adjustable for comfort and load distribution.

Hydration bladder

Modular pouches
Pouches of various utility that can be attached wherever PALS webbing exists. One type is a "sustainment pouch", which holds three MREs.  The various MOLLE pouches are commonly used to carry ammunition, gas masks, batons, flares, grenades, handcuffs and pepper spray, and custom pouches include PALS-compatible pistol holders, hydration pouches and utility pouches.  These pouches are normally secured through the use of straps, alice clips or speedclips.

MOLLE and PALS

The term MOLLE is technically only used to describe the specific system manufactured by Specialty Defense Systems, but is also casually used interchangeably to describe generically all load bearing systems and subsystems that utilize the woven PALS (Pouch Attachment Ladder System) webbing for modular pouch attachment (though PALS is proprietary to Natick Labs, most use MOLLE and PALS interchangeably). Derivatives based on the MOLLE attachment method (such as the Tactical Tailor MALICE clip system) have also been developed. Any system that utilizes modular attachment methods and is usable with U.S. general issue MOLLE components is often considered "MOLLE-compatible" or is called a "MOLLE" system. Increasingly, non-military manufacturers are incorporating PALS onto outdoor equipment.

There are three general modes of attachment in the MOLLE arena; the "Natick Snap", which uses a polyethylene reinforced webbing strap with the 'pushthedot' snap fastener for security; the polymer "Malice" clip, developed by Tactical Tailor as an alternative to the Natick Snap concept, which interweaves like the Natick Snap but terminates in a semi-permanent closure that requires a screwdriver or other flat-tipped object to disengage; and a variety of attachments that fall into the "Weave & Tuck" category, in which the end of an interwoven strap is tucked into an item's backing after attachment to a vest or pack (Paraclete's SofStrap and Spec Ops Brand's hybrid attachment).

The PALS grid consists of horizontal rows of  webbing, spaced 25 mm apart, and attached to the backing at  intervals.

Evolution and criticism
The MOLLE system was introduced in 1997. However, it did not see widespread issue until after the September 11 attacks in 2001, and was used by U.S. troops serving in Afghanistan and Iraq. Early criticisms of the MOLLE system emerged, particularly from the Army. Many of these criticisms have centered on the sustainment-load pack and frame, due to the external plastic frame being too fragile and subject to breaking in the field (since mitigated), that the zippers have a tendency to burst when stuffed full and that the pack's straps lack sufficient length to be used with bulky body armor. The first generation of this system used a ball and socket joint between the frame and rucksack belt (which in itself formed the waistbelt of the MOLLE vest). This method led to numerous lower back injuries due to the ball (mounted on the frame) missing the socket on the waistbelt and hurting the user's body. Subsequent redesign of the SDS MOLLE led to the deletion of this feature and thus the vest (FLC) and ruck/frame were separate non-integral items.

See also
 Individual Integrated Fighting System (IIFS)
 Interceptor body armor
 Personal Load Carrying Equipment (PLCE), used by the British Army

References

External links
 ciehub.info
 gear-illustration.com

Military equipment introduced in the 1990s
Military equipment of the United States
Personal military carrying equipment